Kayser Sung is a journalist, littérateur, and recipient of the Ramon Magsaysay Award.

See also
History of journalism

References

Ramon Magsaysay Award winners
Chinese journalists
Living people
Year of birth missing (living people)
Place of birth missing (living people)